These are the official results of the Women's 200 metres event at the 1987 IAAF World Championships in Rome, Italy. There were a total number of 31 participating athletes, with four qualifying heats and the final held on Thursday 1987-09-03.

Results

Final
Thursday, 3 September 1987  Wind: +1.2

Semifinals
Thursday, 3 September 1987
Wind:
Heat 1: -1.0
Heat 2: -1.9

Heats
Tuesday, 1 September 1987
Wind: 
Heat 1: -3.4
Heat 2: -0.6
Heat 3: -2.6
Heat 4: -0.6

See also
 1983 Women's World Championships 200 metres (Helsinki)
 1984 Women's Olympic 200 metres (Los Angeles)
 1986 Women's European Championships 200 metres (Stuttgart)
 1988 Women's Olympic 200 metres (Seoul)
 1990 Women's European Championships 200 metres (Split)
 1991 Women's World Championships 200 metres (Tokyo)
 1992 Women's Olympic 200 metres (Barcelona)

References
 Results

 
200 metres at the World Athletics Championships
1987 in women's athletics